This is a list of 251 species in Philonthus, a genus of large rove beetles in the family Staphylinidae.

Philonthus species

 Philonthus aberrans Cameron, 1932 g
 Philonthus acromyrmecis Scheerpeltz, 1976 g
 Philonthus aculeatus Coiffait, 1963 g
 Philonthus addendus Sharp, 1867 g
 Philonthus aeneipennis Boheman g
 Philonthus aequalis Horn, 1884 g
 Philonthus aerosus Kiesenwetter, 1851 g
 Philonthus alberti Schillhammer, 2000 g
 Philonthus albipes (Gravenhorst, 1802) g
 Philonthus alcyoneus Erichson, 1840 g
 Philonthus alpinus Eppelsheim, 1875 g
 Philonthus alterius Cameron, 1951 g
 Philonthus amnicola Gistel, 1857 g
 Philonthus analis Erichson, 1840 g
 Philonthus anguinus Fauvel, 1874 g
 Philonthus antipodum Fauvel, 1877 g
 Philonthus aprilinus Gistel, 1857 g
 Philonthus archangelicus Poppius, 1908 g
 Philonthus argus Herman g
 Philonthus asper Horn, 1884 g b
 Philonthus assimilis Nordmann, 1837 g
 Philonthus atratoides Coiffait, 1963 g
 Philonthus atratus (Gravenhorst, 1802) g
 Philonthus aurulentus Horn, 1884 g b
 Philonthus australis Cameron, 1943 g
 Philonthus bicolor Fauvel, 1903 g
 Philonthus bicoloristylus Chani-Posse g
 Philonthus biskrensis Fagel, 1957 g
 Philonthus blossius Smetana, 1995 g
 Philonthus bonariensis Bernhauer, 1909 g
 Philonthus boreas Smetana, 1995 g b
 Philonthus brachypterus Solsky, 1872 g
 Philonthus bruchianus Chani-Posse g
 Philonthus busiris Smetana, 1995 g
 Philonthus caeruleipennis  g b
 Philonthus caerulescens (Lacordaire, 1835) g
 Philonthus carbonarius (Gravenhorst, 1802) g
 Philonthus caucasicus Nordmann, 1837 g b
 Philonthus caurinus Horn, 1884 g
 Philonthus cautus  b
 Philonthus cerambus Smetana, 1995 g
 Philonthus chalceus Stephens, 1832 g
 Philonthus chopardi Cameron, 1950 g
 Philonthus cochleatus Scheerpeltz, 1937 g
 Philonthus coenicola Gistel, 1857 g
 Philonthus cognatus Stephens, 1832 g b
 Philonthus confinis Strand, 1941 g
 Philonthus coprophilus Jarrige, 1949 g
 Philonthus coracion Peyerimhoff, 1902 g
 Philonthus corruscus (Gravenhorst, 1802) g
 Philonthus corvinus Erichson, 1839 g
 Philonthus couleensis Hatch, 1957 g b
 Philonthus crassicornis Fauvel, 1895 g
 Philonthus cribriventris Bernhauer, 1912 g
 Philonthus crotchi Horn, 1884 g
 Philonthus cruentatus (Gmelin, 1790) g b
 Philonthus cunctans Horn, 1884 g
 Philonthus cunicularius Gistel, 1857 g
 Philonthus cyanipennis (Fabricius, 1793) g
 Philonthus davus Smetana, 1995 g
 Philonthus debilis (Gravenhorst, 1802) g b
 Philonthus decorus (Gravenhorst, 1802) g
 Philonthus delicatulus Boheman, 1858 g
 Philonthus derennei Drugmand, 1987 g
 Philonthus dilutipes Fauvel, 1898 g
 Philonthus dimidiatipennis Erichson, 1840 g
 Philonthus discoideus (Gravenhorst, 1802) i c g
 Philonthus distans Horn, 1884 g
 Philonthus duplicatus Bernhauer & Schubert, 1914 g
 Philonthus ebeninus (Gravenhorst, 1802) g
 Philonthus ephippium Nordmann, 1837 g
 Philonthus eremus Gistel, 1857 g
 Philonthus erraticus Nordmann, 1837 g
 Philonthus eustilbus Kraat, 1859 g
 Philonthus explorator Cameron, 1932 g
 Philonthus fauvelianus Bernhauer g
 Philonthus fenestratus Fauvel, 1872 g
 Philonthus ferreipennis Horn, 1884 g
 Philonthus figulus Erichson, 1840 g
 Philonthus flavibasis Casey, 1915 g
 Philonthus flavipes Kraatz, 1859 g
 Philonthus flavocinctus Motschulsky, 1858 g
 Philonthus flavolimbatus Erichson, 1840 g
 Philonthus flumineus Casey, 1915 g b
 Philonthus foetidus Cameron, 1932 g
 Philonthus formosae Bernhauer g
 Philonthus frigidus Märkel & Kiesenwetter, 1848 g
 Philonthus fulcinius Smetana, 1995 g
 Philonthus fumarius (Gravenhorst, 1806) g
 Philonthus furcifer Renkonen, 1937 g
 Philonthus furvus Nordmann, 1837 g
 Philonthus fusiformis Melsheimer, 1844 g
 Philonthus gagates Mulsant & Rey, 1876 g
 Philonthus gaudens Tottenham, 1939 g
 Philonthus gemellus Kraatz, 1859 g
 Philonthus gopheri Hubbard, 1894 b  (gopher tortoise rove beetle)
 Philonthus gracilior Casey, 1915 g
 Philonthus grandicollis Horn, 1884 g
 Philonthus gratus Cameron, 1943 g
 Philonthus gyllenhali Gistel, 1857 g
 Philonthus haddeni Bierig, 1932 i c g
 Philonthus haemorrhoidalis MacLeay, 1873 g
 Philonthus heinlii Gistel, 1857 g
 Philonthus hepaticus Er. i c g b
 Philonthus heterodoxus Mulsant & Rey, 1876 g
 Philonthus hudsonicus Horn, 1884 g
 Philonthus humilis Erichson, 1840 g
 Philonthus hybridus Cameron, 1930 g
 Philonthus hyperboreus  g
 Philonthus intermedius (Lacordaire, 1835) g
 Philonthus janus Smetana, 1995 g
 Philonthus japonicus Sharp, 1874 g
 Philonthus jurecekianus Bohac & Hromadka, 1980 g
 Philonthus jurgans Tottenham, 1937 g
 Philonthus juvenilis Peyron, 1858 g
 Philonthus kaszabi Smetana, 1967 g
 Philonthus kiyoyamai Hayashi, 1993b g
 Philonthus laetus Heer, 1839 g
 Philonthus laevicollis (Lacordaire, 1835) g
 Philonthus laminatus (Creutzer, 1799) g
 Philonthus lecontei Horn, 1884 g
 Philonthus lederi Eppelsheim, 1893 g
 Philonthus leechensis Hatch, 1957 g
 Philonthus lepidus (Gravenhorst, 1802) g
 Philonthus lewisius Sharp, 1974 g
 Philonthus lindbergi Scheerpeltz, 1958 g
 Philonthus lindrothi Smetana, 1965 g
 Philonthus linki Solsky, 1866 g
 Philonthus littorinus Gistel, 1857 g
 Philonthus lomatus Erichson, 1840 g b
 Philonthus longicornis Stephens, 1832 i c g
 Philonthus luxurians Erichson, 1840 g
 Philonthus madurensis Bernhauer g
 Philonthus maindroni Fauvel, 1903 g
 Philonthus mannerheimi Fauvel, 1868 g
 Philonthus marcidus Wollaston, 1864 g
 Philonthus mareki Coiffait, 1967 g
 Philonthus merops Smetana, 1963 g
 Philonthus micans (Gravenhorst, 1802) g
 Philonthus micantoides Benick & Lohse, 1956 g
 Philonthus mimus Smetana, 1959 g
 Philonthus minutus Boheman g
 Philonthus moldavicus Wendeler, 1924 g
 Philonthus monaeses Smetana, 1995 g b
 Philonthus montanus Bernhauer, 1934 g
 Philonthus montivagus Heer, 1839 g
 Philonthus morosus Casey, 1915 g
 Philonthus nemorosus Gistel, 1857 g
 Philonthus neonatus Smetana, 1965 g
 Philonthus nigriceps Eppelsheim, 1885 g
 Philonthus nigrita (Gravenhorst, 1806) g
 Philonthus nimbicola Fauvel, 1874 g
 Philonthus nitidicollis (Lacordaire, 1835) g
 Philonthus nitidus (Fabricius, 1787) g
 Philonthus notabilis Kraatz g
 Philonthus nudus Sharp, 1874 g
 Philonthus oblitus Jarrige, 1951 g
 Philonthus obscurus Gravenhorst, 1802 g
 Philonthus occidentalis Horn, 1884 g
 Philonthus olfactorius Gistel, 1857 g
 Philonthus onthomanes Gistel, 1857 g
 Philonthus opacipennis Notman, 1919 g
 Philonthus paederoides (Motschulsky, 1858) g
 Philonthus paganettii Linke, 1915 g
 Philonthus palliatus (Gravenhorst, 1806) g b
 Philonthus pallipes Blanchard, 1842 g
 Philonthus palustris C.Brisout de Barneville, 1860 g
 Philonthus parvicornis (Gravenhorst, 1802) g
 Philonthus peliomerus Kraatz, 1859 g
 Philonthus peregrinus Fauvel, 1866 g
 Philonthus perversus Horn, 1884 g
 Philonthus pettiti Horn, 1884 g
 Philonthus picipennis Heer, 1839 g
 Philonthus picnocara Gistel, 1857 g
 Philonthus politus (Linnaeus, 1758) g b
 Philonthus pollens Marquez & Asiain, 2010 g
 Philonthus productus Kraatz, 1859 g
 Philonthus prolatus Sharp, 1874 i c g
 Philonthus propinquus Sharp, 1876 g
 Philonthus pseudolodes Smetana, 1996 g
 Philonthus pseudolus Smetana, 1995 g
 Philonthus pseudovarians Strand, 1941 g
 Philonthus puberulus Horn, 1884 g
 Philonthus pubes Horn, 1884 g
 Philonthus punctatellus Heer, 1839 g
 Philonthus puncticollis Stephens, 1832 g
 Philonthus punctus (Gravenhorst, 1802) g
 Philonthus putridarius Gistel, 1857 g
 Philonthus pyrenaeus Kiesenwetter, 1850 g
 Philonthus quadraticeps Boheman, 1858 g
 Philonthus quadricollis Horn, 1884 g b
 Philonthus quadrulus Horn, 1884 g
 Philonthus quisquiliarius (Gyllenhal, 1810) g
 Philonthus rectangulus Sharp, 1874 g b
 Philonthus retangulus Sharp, 1874 i c g
 Philonthus rivularis Kiesenwetter, 1858 g
 Philonthus rotundicollis (Ménétriés, 1832) g
 Philonthus rubripennis Stephens, 1832 g
 Philonthus rufimanus Erichson, 1840 g
 Philonthus rufipes (Stephens, 1832) g
 Philonthus rufulus Horn, 1884 g b
 Philonthus salinus Kiesenwetter, 1844 g
 Philonthus sanguinolentus (Gravenhorst, 1802) g
 Philonthus scansor Gistel, 1857 g
 Philonthus schwarzi Horn, 1884 g
 Philonthus scybalarius Nordmann, 1837 i c g
 Philonthus semiruber Horn, 1884 g
 Philonthus sericans (Gravenhorst, 1802) g b
 Philonthus sericeus Stephens, 1832 g
 Philonthus sericinus Horn, 1884 g b
 Philonthus sessor Smetana, 1965 g
 Philonthus siculus Gridelli, 1923 g
 Philonthus simpliciventris Bernhauer, 1933 g
 Philonthus smetanai Schillhammer, 2003 g
 Philonthus sospitalis Gistel, 1857 g
 Philonthus speculum Lokay, 1919 g
 Philonthus sphagnorum Smetana, 1995 g
 Philonthus spiniformis Hatch, 1957 g
 Philonthus spinipes Sharp, 1874 g
 Philonthus stictus Hausen, 1891 g
 Philonthus stragulatus Erichson, 1840 g
 Philonthus suavis Brisout de Barneville, 1867 g
 Philonthus suavus Brisout de Barneville, 1867 g
 Philonthus subnivalis Gistel, 1857 g
 Philonthus subvirescens C.G.Thomson, 1884 g
 Philonthus succicola Thomson, 1860 g
 Philonthus tahitiensis Coiffait, 1977 g
 Philonthus taiwanensis Shibata, 1993 g
 Philonthus tardus Kraatz g
 Philonthus temporalis Mulsant & Rey, 1853 g
 Philonthus tenuicornis Mulsant & Rey, 1853 g
 Philonthus tillius Smetana, 1995 g
 Philonthus triangulum Horn, 1884 g b
 Philonthus tumulinus Tottenham, 1955 g
 Philonthus turbatus Erichson, 1840 g
 Philonthus turbidus Erichson, 1839 i c g
 Philonthus turbo Smetana, 1995 g
 Philonthus umbratilis (Gravenhorst, 1802) g
 Philonthus umbrinoides Smetana, 1995 g
 Philonthus umbrinus (Gravenhorst, 1802) g
 Philonthus validus Casey, 1915 g
 Philonthus varians (Paykull, 1789) g
 Philonthus varro Smetana, 1995 g
 Philonthus ventralis Grav. i c g
 Philonthus vesubiensis Coiffait, 1967 g
 Philonthus viduus Erichson, 1840 g
 Philonthus virgo (Gravenhorst, 1802) g
 Philonthus viridipennis Fauvel, 1875 g
 Philonthus vulgatus Casey, 1915 g b
 Philonthus wollastoni Scheerpeltz, 1933 g
 Philonthus zhuk Gusarov, 1995 g

Data sources: i = ITIS, c = Catalogue of Life, g = GBIF, b = Bugguide.net

References

Philonthus
Articles created by Qbugbot